= Amathillopsidae =

Scientific classification
- Domain: Eukaryota
- Kingdom: Animalia
- Phylum: Arthropoda
- Class: Malacostraca
- Order: Amphipoda
- Superfamily: Iphimedioidea
- Family: Amathillopsidae; Pirlot, 1934

Family of crustaceans

Amathillopsidae is a family of crustaceans belonging to the order Amphipoda.

Genera:

- Amathillopsis Heller, 1875
- Cleonardopsis Barnard, 1916
- Parepimeria Chevreux, 1911
